Malangali is a ward in the city of Sumbawanga in Rukwa Region, Tanzania.  According to the 2002 census, the ward has a total population of 4,050.

References

Populated places in Rukwa Region
Wards of Tanzania